The World Group was the highest level of Davis Cup competition in 1996. The first-round losers went into the Davis Cup World Group Qualifying Round, and the winners progressed to the quarterfinals and were guaranteed a World Group spot for 1997.

The United States were the defending champions, but were eliminated in the quarterfinals.

France won the title, defeating Sweden in the final, 3–2. The final was held at the Malmö Isstadion in Malmö, Sweden, from 29 November to 1 December. It was the French team's 8th Davis Cup title overall.

Participating teams

Draw

First round

Italy vs. Russia

South Africa vs. Austria

Switzerland vs. Germany

France vs. Denmark

India vs. Netherlands

Sweden vs. Belgium

Czech Republic vs. Hungary

United States vs. Mexico

Quarterfinals

Italy vs. South Africa

France vs. Germany

India vs. Sweden

Czech Republic vs. United States

Semifinals

France vs. Italy

Czech Republic vs. Sweden

Final

Sweden vs. France

References

External links
Davis Cup official website

World Group
Davis Cup World Group
Davis Cup